The United Lutheran Church is a church located at 324 Chestnut Street in Grand Forks, North Dakota. The historic church building was  listed on the National Register of Historic Places in 1991.

History

United Lutheran Church is the result of a merger of three early Lutheran congregations in Grand Forks: Zion, Trinity and First.
The church is affiliated with the Eastern North Dakota Synod of the   Evangelical Lutheran Church in America.

The church building was constructed during 1931-1932 and was a daring enterprise, in terms of its modern architecture and in terms of the economic times. It is an exceptional Art Deco building. The building is built of North Dakota brick.  The church has a buttressed Art Deco bell tower  that concludes with a ziggurat-like dome. The top portion of the tower was added in 1941.

The church was designed  by the father and son architectural firm of Joseph Bell DeRemer (1871–1944) and Samuel Teel DeRemer (1894-1967)

References

External links
United Lutheran Church, official site

Churches on the National Register of Historic Places in North Dakota
Churches completed in 1932
20th-century Lutheran churches in the United States
Joseph Bell DeRemer buildings
National Register of Historic Places in Grand Forks, North Dakota
Art Deco architecture in North Dakota
1932 establishments in North Dakota
Lutheran churches in North Dakota